The Chaptico, also known as the Cecomocomoco, were a group of Native Americans who lived along the Southwestern shore of the Chesapeake Bay in what is today St. Mary's County, Maryland. They were loosely dominated by the Patuxent in the pre-colonial time. While little is known about their culture, the Chaptico spoke an Algonquian language that was possibly similar to their Patuxent neighbors, who they absorbed in the 1690s.

It is thought the Chaptico were assimilated into nearby Piscataway tribes and/or English settlements in the early 18th century.

Sources
Maryland: A Colonial History p. 22.
Maryland.gov

See also
Chaptico, Maryland, a present-day community in the area

References 

Eastern Algonquian peoples
Extinct Native American tribes
Native American tribes in Maryland